A list of films produced in France in 1919.

See also
 1919 in France

References

External links
 French films of 1919 at the Internet Movie Database

1919
Lists of 1919 films by country or language
Films